John Clive Cecil May  (born 1964) from London, United Kingdom, was the Vice-Chairman of the World Scout Committee, the main executive body of the World Organization of the Scout Movement. He was elected at the 38th World Scout Conference in South Korea for a six-year term, the first United Kingdom Scouter elected since former Chief Scout (later Vice-President) of the Scout Association, Sir Garth Morrison.
In his youth, May worked for Colony Holidays (predecessor to ATE Superweeks).

May has been a Section Leader, a District Commissioner and an elected member of the Committee of the Council. He was appointed International Commissioner in 1991 at the age of 27. He was a member of the organizing committee of the 21st World Scout Jamboree in the United Kingdom in 2007. He was awarded the Bar to the Silver Acorn for his services to Scouting in 2008.

Beginning his career in teaching, he was headteacher at Manor Farm Junior School in Hazlemere in the late 1990s.

May was the Secretary General of the International Award Foundation, which co-ordinates and develops The Duke of Edinburgh's International Award worldwide.

May was formerly the chief executive of Career Academies UK, London.

He received the Queen's Award for Enterprise Promotion in recognition of his dedication to enterprise education.

In 2014 May was awarded the Gustaf Adolfs-märket, an award given by Scouterna (Sweden).

In 2015 May was awarded the Silver Wolf, the highest award given by The Scout Association of the United Kingdom.

In 2016 May was awarded the Bronze Wolf, the only award given by the World Organisation of the Scout Movement.

May was awarded the Freedom of the City of London in 2009 and is a Deputy Lieutenant (DL) for Oxfordshire He was appointed Officer of the Order of the British Empire (OBE) in the 2020 New Year Honours for services to young people.

References

External links
 
 Home

1964 births
Living people
World Scout Committee members
The Scout Association
Queen's Award for Enterprise Promotion (2008)
Recipients of the Bronze Wolf Award
Officers of the Order of the British Empire